Petikirige Dayaratna (born October 1, 1936) is a Sri Lankan politician and a member of the Parliament of Sri Lanka. He was elected to Ampara electorate in 1977 as a Member of Parliament from the United National Party.

Biography
Petikirige Dayaratna was born on October 1, 1936. His parents were Petikirige Wimalasena and Dehipitiyage Leelawathie Gunawardene of Wethera village, Polgasowita. Born in the maternal ancestral home in the hamlet of Godigamuwa in Kalutara District, he received his basic education in the school of his home town, Wethara, and in 1947 entered Ananda College, Colombo, to complete his secondary education. In 1961, he gained admission to Brighton Technical College, England, where he graduated as an electrical engineer in 1965 and returned home on April 23, 1965. On May 17, 1965, he joined state service as an Assistant Electrical Engineer of Gal Oya Development Board stationed at Ampara. 

In 1965 he was appointed the electrical engineer of the Department of Government Electrical Undertakings, which, during his tenure of office, became the Ceylon Electricity Board (CEB).

At the 1970 General Election, Ampara was the citadel of leftist forces, and Dayaratna, who resigned from government service and contested the Ampara seat, lost to his rival, Somaratne Senarath, a staunch leftist from Ampara.

While serving as the electrical engineer of CEB in August 1967, Dayaratna was elected as the President of the Mandala Mahaviharaya Buddhist Society of Ampara Town and under the guidance of Ven. Dodamduwe Dhammaratana Nayaka Thera, completed the construction work of the Cetiya within two years.

Dayaratna married Deepthika Dayaratna on June 2, 1971. The couple have three children.

With the blessings of then UNP Leader J. R. Jayewardene, he contested the Ampara seat at the 1977 General Election and won with a majority of 8,000 votes recording the first-ever victory for the UNP in Ampara electorate.

In October 1978 he became the District Minister for Ampara, in 1981 he was appointed Deputy Minister of Power and Energy and became Minister in 1987. In February 1989 he was given the portfolio of Lands, Irrigation and Mahaweli Development and in April 1991 he was made the Minister of Rehabilitation, Reconstruction and Social Welfare.

Although the UNP lost power at the General Election in 1994, Dayaratna was re-elected as a UNP member for Ampara District. He was re-elected at the subsequent elections held in 2000, 2001, 2004 and 2010.  He was the Minister of Health, Nutrition and Welfare of under the UNF Government. In 2007 he joined the UPFA with 17 others to support Mahinda Rajapaksa, but joined the UNP in 2015.

See also
 Cabinet of Sri Lanka

References

External links
 

1936 births
Living people
Members of the 8th Parliament of Sri Lanka
Members of the 9th Parliament of Sri Lanka
Members of the 10th Parliament of Sri Lanka
Members of the 11th Parliament of Sri Lanka
Members of the 12th Parliament of Sri Lanka
Members of the 13th Parliament of Sri Lanka
Members of the 14th Parliament of Sri Lanka
Government ministers of Sri Lanka
United National Party politicians
United People's Freedom Alliance politicians
Sinhalese engineers
District ministers of Sri Lanka
Social affairs ministers of Sri Lanka